The Temple of Quirinus (Latin : Aedes Quirinus or Templum Quirinus) was an ancient Roman temple built on the western half of the Quirinal Hill near the Capitolium Vetus, on a site which now equates to the junction between Via del Quirinale and Via delle Quattro Fontane, beside Piazza Barberini. Domitian later built the Temple of the gens Flavia nearby. 

According to ancient authors, the temple of Quirinus was built and dedicated to Quirinus (the deified form of Romulus) by the consul Lucius Papirius Cursor in 293 BC.

If still in use by the 4th-and 5th century, it would have been closed during the persecution of pagans in the late Roman Empire. 

Fieldwork conducted by Andrea Carandini employed ground penetrating radar on the Quirinal Hill, revealing possible remains of the temple.

See also
List of Ancient Roman temples

References

Quirinus
Rome R. II Trevi
Roman temples by deity
3rd-century BC religious buildings and structures